CTKD is first duet album Indonesian singer Krisdayanti and Malaysian singer Siti Nurhaliza. CTKD is the abbreviation of Canda (Joke), Tangis (Cry), Ketawa (Laugh), Duka (Sad), since they are both known as CT (Siti) and KD (Krisdayanti). The album was released on 28 December 2009.

Track listing
With six songs, the album was created by famous Malaysian and Indonesian composers and writers like Aubrey Suwito, Audi Mok, Sharon Paul and others to suit both their vocal range and harmony. For the first time in this album, Dato’ Siti Nurhaliza uses vocalist from ST12, Charly. It also includes 4 bonus instrumental songs of their songs on the album.

Indonesia Version

References

2009 albums
Siti Nurhaliza albums
Vocal duet albums
Malay-language albums